Álvaro Tardáguila Silva (born  August 16, 1975) is a Uruguayan professional racing cyclist. Winner of the 2005 edition of his home tour, the Vuelta del Uruguay, Tardáguila is the son of Walter Tardáguila, a 1972 Olympian (cycling road race and team time trial) and also winner of the 1972 edition of the Vuelta Ciclista del Uruguay.

Doping
Tardaguila served a two-year ban for doping after testing positive for EPO and an anabolic agent at the 2005 Great Downer Avenue Bike Race in Milwaukee, Wisconsin, USA. While announced by USADA in February 2006, the suspension was retroactive to Oct. 17, 2005. Tardáguila last competed for the Club Ciclista Deportivo San Antonio.

Career highlights

 2003: 3rd in Mount Holly-Smithville (USA)
 2004: 1st in Stage 4 Tour de Korea, Yang Yang (KOR)
 2004: 1st in Murraysville Classic (USA)
 2005: 1st in Stage 5 Clásica del Oeste-Doble Bragado, O'Brien (ARG)
 2005: 1st in Stage 7 Clásica del Oeste-Doble Bragado, Caseros (ARG)
 2005: 1st in General Classification Vuelta Ciclista del Uruguay (URU)
 2005: 2nd in Mount Holly-Smithville (USA) (officially removed from race results after testing positive)
 2005: 2nd in General Classification Tour of Christiana (USA)
 2005: 2nd in Univest GP, Criterium (USA)
 2006: 1st in Stage 6 Rutas de America, Tacuarembo (URU)
 2008: 3rd in General Classification Vuelta al Chana (URU)

See also
 List of doping cases in cycling

References

External links

1975 births
Living people
Uruguayan male cyclists
Uruguayan people of Spanish descent
Uruguayan sportspeople in doping cases
Doping cases in cycling